Southwood College was founded in 1874 in Salemburg, North Carolina and closed in 1973.  For many years, two schools, Edwards Military Institute and Pineland College, operated on the same site; on July 1, 1965, the institutions officially became Southwood College.

History
The history of Southwood College began in 1875.  Isham Royal founded Salemburg Academy, a one-room, private educational institution for girls. Private academies such as Salemburg flourished before the widespread introduction of public schools. One of the first principals was Marion Butler, later U.S. senator from North Carolina. In 1914, the program reorganized as the Pineland School for Girls following receipt of a donation of $70,000 from Benjamin N. Duke, son of Washington Duke, namesake of Duke University, and a commensurate contribution from local citizens

In 1926, the curriculum was broadened, several more buildings constructed, and the library expanded. The school became Pineland Junior College and served as a female only institution. The Edwards Military Institute, was added and was named for Methodist minister Anderson Edwards, who had contributed his life savings to the construction of the military academy.

In 1952, the schools had the youngest college president in the United States, Willard Jackson Blanchard, a World War II veteran, who at the time was thirty-two years old.

On July 1, 1965, the two schools merged and became Southwood College. The school closed its doors in 1973. That year, the North Carolina Department of Justice took over the grounds, and developed the North Carolina Justice Academy for the training of North Carolina criminal justice officers. The North Carolina Justice Academy still utilizes the Blanchard Learning Resource Center, the Royal Classroom Building, the Jones Auditorium, a cafeteria and an office building that were originally part of Southwood College.

Administration

Notes

References 

 Oscar M. Bizzell, The Heritage of Sampson County (1983) 
 William S. Powell, Higher Education in North Carolina (1964) 
 (Raleigh) News and Observer, October 30, 1949 
 Paul Pleasants, "One Small College Pays its Own Way," The State (July 1952) 
 Don Britt, "Outstanding and Unique Facts About Pineland College-Edwards Military Institute," (typescript report in files of Research Branch, North Carolina Office of Archives and History, n.d.)

Defunct private universities and colleges in North Carolina
Educational institutions established in 1874
Educational institutions disestablished in 1973
1874 establishments in North Carolina